2000 in Armenian football was the ninth season of independent football after the split-up from the Soviet Union. The Armenian Premier League for 2000 existed of 8 teams of which the lowest ranked teams would relegate to the Armenian First League. The seventh ranked team would enter the promotion/relegation play-off with the second ranked team of the First League. However it was decided that none of the Premier League teams would be relegated and four clubs were promoted from the First League, as well as FC Banants that was given a place at the highest level for the 2001 season. In the last few weeks Ararat, Zvartnots-AAL, Dinamo and Mika all refused to play once or more times as they were demanding fair play and claiming that referees penalised them repeatedly in favour of Araks that eventually won the title due to the awarded 3-0 victories in their favour.

Premier League
 FC Dinamo Yerevan and FC Mika-Kasakh are promoted.
 FC Mika-Kasakh is renamed FC Mika
 Tsement changed their name to FC Araks Ararat.
 FC Yerevan and Erebuni-Homenmen both withdrew before the start of the season. As a result, Kilikia FC who were originally relegated kept their place.
 FC Lernagorts Kapan are additionally promoted to have an eight team competition.

Top goalscorers

First League
 FC Armenicum and Tavush Ijevan are introduced to the league.
 Kotayk returned to professional football.

Armenia Cup

External links
 RSSSF: Armenia 2000